In Microsoft Windows, resources are read-only data embedded in portable executable files like .exe, DLL, CPL, SCR, SYS or (beginning with Windows Vista) MUI files.

The Windows API provides for easy access to all applications resources.

Types
Each resource has a type and a name, both being either numeric identifiers or strings.

Windows has a set of predefined resource types:
 Cursor and animated cursor
 Icon 
 Bitmap
 Dialog box template
 Font
 HTML document
 String and message template
 Version data
 Manifest data
 arbitrary (binary) data

The programmer can also define custom data types in resources.

Usage
The icon that Windows displays for a program file is actually the first icon resource in its EXE file. If the EXE file has no icon resources, a standard icon is displayed.

The version resource for EXE and DLL files is displayed in the Version tab of their property pages.

Resources always have a language attached to them, and Windows will automatically use the most fitting language if possible. This allows for programs adapting their language to the locale of the user.

Editors are available that can modify resources embedded in EXE or DLL files. These are typically used to translate all strings of an application to another language, or to modify its icons and bitmaps accordingly.

References

External links
 MSDN: Windows Resource Files Guide
 MSDN: Better Resource File Guide with reference

Windows architecture